The 2015 POMIS Cup is the 17th championship, starting group matches on 22 January 2015 and the final match played on 28 January 2015 at National Football Stadium, Malé, Maldives.
PDRM FA won the People's Cup final against Maziya S&RC.

Teams
The top two teams of 2014 Dhivehi League and two invited foreign clubs.

Teams and nation
Note: Table lists clubs in alphabetical order.

Standings

Rules for classification: 1) points; 2) goal difference; 3) number of goals scored.

Matches

Group matches
A total of 6 matches will be playing in this round.

Final

Statistics

Scorers

Assists

References

2015
2015 in Maldivian football
2015 in Malaysian football
2015 in Singaporean football